The following events occurred in April 1966:

April 1, 1966 (Friday)
General Pham Xuan Chieu, a member of South Vietnam's 10-man military junta who was appearing as an emissary of Vietnam's Prime Minister Nguyễn Cao Kỳ to seek popular support, was surrounded by a mob of 1,000 students and Buddhist activists as he arrived at city government offices.  The group then held him captive, transported him around the city in a cycle rickshaw, forced him to make a speech at the local radio station, and then released him unharmed.
At the Communist Party Congress, Soviet Defense Minister Rodion Malinovsky made a cryptic reference to "the blue belt" of national defense, then discussed recently constructed intercontinental ballistic missiles and nuclear submarines, along with other weapons that could destroy "any planes and many rockets of the adversary".
Born: Chris Evans, English television and radio presenter, in Warrington
Died: Brian O'Nolan, 54, Irish humorist who wrote under the pen names "Flann O'Brien" and "Myles na Gopaleen", of throat cancer

April 2, 1966 (Saturday)
People's Daily, the official newspaper of the Chinese Communist Party, published an editorial by cultural critic Qi Benyu, titled "On the Essence of 'Han Rui Scolding the Emperor' and 'Hai Rui Dismissed from Office'", in what would be a prelude for the Party's calls for a violent public uprising.
Ten thousand protesters (including 2,000 South Vietnamese soldiers and sailors in uniform) marched through the streets of Da Nang in South Vietnam and denounced both the United States and the South Vietnamese government of Prime Minister Nguyen Cao Ky.  Da Nang Mayor Nguyen Van Man, who had allowed protesters free use of city offices, motor vehicles and printing facilities, was accused of treason by Ky, who said that he planned to have Man executed by a firing squad.
On his fourth day in office, Ecuador's new President, Clemente Yerovi, announced that he was cancelling a presidential election that had been scheduled for July.
Died: C. S. Forester (Cecil Louis Troughton Smith), 66, English adventure novelist known for the Horatio Hornblower series.

April 3, 1966 (Sunday)
At 18:44 UTC (9:44 p.m. in Moscow), the Soviet lunar probe Luna 10 became the first human-made object to orbit the Moon. Luna 10 would make a complete trip around the Moon every three hours and would transmit signals back to earth until May 30.
A North Sea gale ran the British passenger ship Anzio aground at Donna Nook, Lincolnshire, near the mouth of the Humber River, and it was demolished. The ship, which had recently been purchased and was en route from London to Inverness to be delivered to its new owners, was occupied only by its skipper, Adam Fotheringham, and twelve other crewmembers. There were no survivors. The bodies of ten men, all wearing life jackets but killed after being battered by debris and the rocks, washed ashore on the beach, while three men (including Captain Fotheringham) were presumed to have gone down with the ship.
Died: Battista Farina, 72, Italian car designer

April 4, 1966 (Monday)
So Sau Chung began a hunger strike at the entrance of the Star Ferry Terminal in Hong Kong's Central District, sparking the Hong Kong 1966 riots. At issue was the recent announcement that the fare for ferry boats would be increased by one cent; the next day, hundreds of youths joined him in a protest. Within days, thousands of young protesters were setting fires, smashing glass windows, and battling British colonial police.
NASA announced the names of its fifth group of astronauts, 19 men qualified for missions in the 1970s. From the fifth generation of explorers came Apollo astronauts Fred Haise and Jack Swigert (Apollo 13), Edgar Mitchell and Stuart Roosa (Apollo 14), James Irwin and Alfred Worden (Apollo 15), Charles Duke and Ken Mattingly (Apollo 16), Ronald Evans (Apollo 17) and Vance D. Brand (Apollo-Soyuz); Skylab astronauts Paul J. Weitz (Skylab 2), Jack R. Lousma (Skylab 3) and Gerald P. Carr and William R. Pogue (Skylab 4); and space shuttle astronauts Joe Engle, Don L. Lind and Bruce McCandless II. Two would not go into outer space; John S. Bull would be disqualified by a medical condition, while Edward Givens would be killed in an automobile accident in 1967.
Atlas 5303, target launch vehicle for Gemini IX, was erected at launch complex 14. Electrical power was applied on April 11, and the Booster Flight Acceptance Composite Test was completed April 27.
A deadly tornado family affected the I-4 corridor in Central Florida from the Tampa Bay area to Brevard County. Eleven people were killed across the state in what remains one of only two F4 tornadoes ever to strike that U.S. state.
Born: Viceregal, Canadian Champion Thoroughbred racehorse, at Windfields Farm (died 1984)

April 5, 1966 (Tuesday)
In an attempt to suppress the Buddhist Uprising, South Vietnamese prime minister and strongman Nguyễn Cao Kỳ personally attempted to lead the capture of the restive city of Đà Nẵng before backing down.

Soviet Prime Minister Alexei Kosygin said in a speech to the 23rd Communist Party Congress that the nation would begin measuring economic success by profits rather than by achievement of production target quantities. Starting in 1967, Kosygin said, nearly one-third of factory workers would be eligible for incentive bonuses. He asked the Party Congress to approve a new Five Year Economic Plan implementing the changes.
The International Convention on Load Lines was signed in London, UK.

The first Congressional hearing about unidentified flying objects (UFOs) was convened in Washington, D.C., before the House Armed Services Committee, chaired by U.S. Representative L. Mendel Rivers of South Carolina. The request for the Congressional investigation had been made by House Republican leader (and future U.S. President) Gerald R. Ford of Michigan.
Acting upon authority granted by NASA Headquarters and approval of Manned Spacecraft Center (MSC)'s statement of work, Kenneth S. Kleinknecht, MSC Gemini Program Deputy Manager, informed officials in Washington and Huntsville that Houston had presented requests for proposals to Douglas, Grumman, and McDonnell to undertake definition studies on the Saturn S-IVB spent-stage experiment support module (SSESM). Study contracts were issued April 18. The contractors were ordered to submit definitive statements of work within 60 days proposing a fixed price for one module (with an option for three additional modules). Under these initial study contracts, spacecraft hardware already flight-qualified would be used wherever practicable.
NBC television broadcast the final original episode of Dr. Kildare. In its final season, the popular show had been moved from one hour on Thursday nights, to half-hour programs shown on Monday and Tuesday, "with disastrous results", and was canceled after poor ratings.

April 6, 1966 (Wednesday)
The Beatles began their "Studio Years", discontinuing public concerts in favor of simply releasing new albums and singles for sale, as the first song was recorded for their upcoming album Revolver. That session, with John Lennon singing "Tomorrow Never Knows", marked the first use of automatic double tracking (ADT), invented by EMI recording engineer Ken Townsend, and the first to include music played backwards.
Reginald Prentice replaced Charles Pannell as Minister of Public Buildings and Works and George Thomson replaced Douglas Houghton as Chancellor of the Duchy of Lancaster in the British government. The Earl of Longford succeeded Sir Frank Soskice as Lord Privy Seal, and Frederick Lee became Secretary of State for the Colonies.
The first secret meeting concerning the merger of professional football's National Football League and the American Football League took place at a parking lot in Dallas, between Dallas Cowboys owner Tex Schramm and Kansas City Chiefs owner Lamar Hunt.
Born: Vince Flynn, American thriller novelist known for the "Mitch Rapp" series of political thrillers, starting with 1999's Transfer of Power; in St. Paul, Minnesota (d. 2013)

April 7, 1966 (Thursday)

After an 80-day operation in the Mediterranean Sea, the United States finally recovered the hydrogen bomb that had been lost off of the coast of Spain.  After being raised from the sea by a winch, the bomb was loaded onto the rescue ship USS Petrel and shipped back to the United States.
Test pilot Robert G. Ferry landed a Hughes OH-6A Pawnee helicopter in Ormond Beach, Florida after flying 2,213.1 miles from Culver City, California without refueling, to set the record for the longest non-stop helicopter flight.
Police in Japan arrested Dr. Mitsuru Suzuki at the Chiba University Hospital, where he was employed as a bacteriologist.  Between December 25, 1964, and March 15, 1966, Dr. Suzuki had deliberately infected 200 people— four of them fatally— including many of his co-workers, with various diseases from bacteria that he had placed into food.  Over a period of 15 months, he laced a sponge cake with dysentery; and medicines, shellfish, a cake, bananas, and bottles of a soft drink with typhoid.  Suzuki was prosecuted for 66 cases of infecting people, but not for any of the deaths.
The United Kingdom asked the United Nations Security Council for authority to use force to stop the Joanna V, an oil tanker that anchored outside the harborwas loading petroleum at a port in Portuguese East Africa (now Mozambique) and preparing to violate the United Nations embargo against Rhodesia (now Zimbabwe)

April 8, 1966 (Friday)
The terrorist group Fatah caused its first death in Israel when an Israeli farmer was killed by a land mine that had been placed by members who had sneaked across the border with Syria. After more mine casualties, Israel would launch air strikes against Syria and, in June 1967, would make the first strike against its Arab neighbors in the Six-Day War.

Leonid Brezhnev, First Secretary of the Communist Party of the Soviet Union since replacing Nikita Khrushchev in 1964, was unanimously elected by the Party's Central Committee as the party's leader, now referred to as the General Secretary of the Communist Party of the Soviet Union. In addition, the 12-man Presidium of the CPSU was renamed the Politburo, and its roster changed to 11 members. The last of the "old Bolsheviks" in the Kremlin hierarchy, 70-year-old Anastas Mikoyan and 78-year-old Nikolai Shvernik, were allowed to retire. Shvernik was replaced by newcomer Arvids Pelshe. The other ten members of the Politburo were Brezhnev, Prime Minister Alexei Kosygin, party ideologist Mikhail Suslov, Russian Federation premier Gennady Voronov, Russian first deputy premiers Kiril Mazurov and Dmitry Polyansky, and Ukraine Party First Secretary Pyotr Shelest.
Both ships sank, but all crew were rescued by the Dutch ship Luden.
All 494 people on board the Norwegian cruise ship Viking Princess were saved from a fire that swept through the luxury ocean liner while it was sailing in the Caribbean Sea between Aruba and Curaçao, although three of the passengers died of heart attacks during their escape. "It's funny the way the passengers all stuck together," a passenger would later say, "It was a very peculiar thing. No shouting or screaming." The ship's captain, Otto Thoresen, said that it took the passengers only ten minutes to enter lifeboats after the 'abandon ship' order was given. At the time, the closest ship, the German vessel Cap Norte, was still 90 minutes away.
In one of the most controversial covers of Time magazine, the national newsweekly's cover for Good Friday, 1966, had a black background and, in bold red letters, the question "Is God Dead?"
NASA launched its first Orbiting Astronomical Observatory, OAO-1, with detection instruments that would measure stellar ultraviolet radiation without the interference that ground-based telescopes faced on Earth. Unfortunately, the spacecraft's batteries would be depleted two days after the launch, after a high-voltage arc when powering up the trackers.
The last poll tax in the United States was outlawed when a three-judge panel of the Fifth U.S. Circuit Court of Appeals voided the requirement in Mississippi, in accordance with the U.S. Supreme Court's ruling in Harper v. Virginia State Board of Elections. Since 1890, a registered voter had to present receipts showing payment of the poll tax for the two preceding Januarys before being allowed to cast a vote in a Mississippi election. Ostensibly, the law had been justified as a fundraiser for the "common school fund", but the poll tax accounted for only 0.43% of Mississippi's education revenues. As a practical matter, the poll tax was a deterrent to participation by low income Southerners, and most African-Americans. Earlier in the year, similar decisions had outlawed the taxes in Texas, Alabama and Virginia.
Two boys, aged 13 and 12, who ran away from their homes in Fayetteville, North Carolina, sneaked on to a railroad box car and then found themselves locked inside for the next 13 days. The sealed car was carrying a cargo of nearly empty beer bottles to the Schlitz Brewing Company in Milwaukee, Wisconsin, and for nearly two weeks, they survived by drinking small amounts of stale beer, until April 21, when they arrived in Milwaukee and workmen at the brewing company heard their cries for help.
Born: Robin Wright, American actress, in Dallas

April 9, 1966 (Saturday)
Spain temporarily lifted the censorship of newspapers that had been in effect since the end of the Spanish Civil War in 1936, and restored freedom of the press. The new liberties would be short-lived and would be rescinded in a decree on January 24, 1969.
United Nations Security Council Resolution 221 was adopted by a 10 to 0 vote, with five abstentions, and authorized the United Kingdom to use military force to enforce a U.N. embargo against Southern Rhodesia. Two permanent members, the Soviet Union and France, abstained, but did not veto the British-sponsored resolution. The vote authorized the Royal Navy to halt the Greek oil tanker Joanna V, already at anchor outside the Portuguese Mozambique port of Beira, from going any further and unloading its petroleum cargo for delivery through a pipeline to Rhodesia, and to stop the incoming ship Manuela from sailing into Beira.
In response to a request from NASA Deputy Administrator Robert C. Seamans, Jr., Saturn/Apollo Applications Deputy Director John H. Disher asked Jerry McCall, Marshall Space Flight Center (MSFC)'s Deputy Director for Research and Development Operations, to prepare cost and schedule estimates for MSFC to integrate the Apollo Telescope Mount (ATM) with the Apollo Lunar Module (LEM). This request stemmed from a desire by the Office of Space Science and Applications (OSSA) to acquire ATM experiment data during upcoming periods of maximum solar activity. Disher listed guidelines for the MSFC estimates:
OSSA-desired flight dates were April 1968, February 1969, and February 1970.
Goddard Space Flight Center would be responsible for development of experiments aboard the ATM, as well as for the mounting structure and thermal provisions.
MSFC would be responsible for development of modification kits to convert all Apollo lunar-landing-configured LEM to an Apollo Applications Project (AAP) laboratory configuration (including provisions for reuse after three to six mouths storage in orbit); for development of interface modification kits needed to integrate the ATM and its experiments with the AAP LEM laboratory; and for installation of the modification kits and the ATM system in the LEM at Kennedy Space Center (KSC) prior to checkout and launch.
In addition, Disher told McCall that MSFC should examine two approaches to ATM LEM integration: (1) gimbal mounted and (2) hard mounted with provisions for momentum transfer for fine pointing control.
Born:
Thomas Doll, German soccer football midfielder who played for East Germany's national team and later for the team of reunified Germany; in Malchin, East Germany
Cynthia Nixon, American TV and stage actress, winner of two Emmy Awards, two Tony Awards and a Grammy Award; in New York City
Died:
Barry Butler, 31, English footballer, in a car accident
Sutan Sjahrir, 56, Indonesia independence leader and that nation's first Prime Minister, died following a stroke

April 10, 1966 (Sunday)
The Royal Navy, acting under the authorization of the Security Council, boarded the oil tanker Manuela and directed it not to continue toward Beira.  Over the next two years, the Navy would stop 29 more ships in order to prevent Rhodesia from getting oil through its pipeline from Mozambique.
The Central Committee of the Chinese Communist Party approved a directive that disapproved of almost all of the literary and artistic works that had been created since the 1949 founding of the People's Republic, on the ground that they reflected an "anti-party and anti-socialist black line... that combines bourgeois literary theory and modern revisionist literary theory" that was contrary to the thought of Chairman Mao.  The ruling, sent out nationwide, made criminal suspects of China's artists and writers during the Cultural Revolution.
New Jersey became the first U.S. state to create a Public Defender's Office to pay for free criminal defense for anyone charged with a crime and unable to afford a private attorney.

The march of grape farm workers from Delano, California came to a conclusion after 250 miles and 25 days as the original group of 65 was joined by thousands of supporters at the State Capitol building in Sacramento, where union leader Cesar Chavez announced the successful negotiation of a favorable contract between the National Farm Workers Association and Schenley Industries.
Died: Evelyn Waugh (Arthur Evelyn St. John Waugh), 62, British writer of novels, biographies and travel books

April 11, 1966 (Monday)
The inaugural Singapore Grand Prix motor race was won by Lee Han Seng of Singapore.  The race would be discontinued after 1973, but revived thirty-five years later in 2008.
Emmett Ashford made his debut as the first African-American Major League Baseball umpire, appearing in Washington, D.C. at third base in the Washington Senators' season opening game against the Cleveland Indians.  Cleveland won, 5-2, before a record Washington baseball crowd of 44,468.
The conservative newsweekly U.S. News & World Report became the first American news magazine to analogize the Vietnam War as a "stalemate" with neither side likely to defeat the other.  Newsweek would not use the term until December 19, and TIME not until June 30, 1967.
Sandoz Pharmaceuticals, the only licensed distributor in the United States of LSD discontinued all further American sales of the hallucinogenic drug.  According to a spokesman, Sandoz had "released it only to highly qualified clinical investigators", but voluntarily quit due to "unforeseen public reaction".
Born: Lisa Stansfield, English singer, in Manchester
Died: Chris Soumokil, 60, South Moluccan separatist leader who fought against the government of Indonesia, was executed in an Indonesian prison.  On April 25, 1950, he had proclaimed the "Republic of South Maluku" on several of the islands that made up the South Moluccas and named himself President, but had been arrested in 1963.

April 12, 1966 (Tuesday)
The Japan Art Theater Guild released Patriotism, a short film written, produced and directed by Yukio Mishima, based on his 1960 short story of the same name.
For the first time, American B-52 planes bombed North Vietnam, after years of bombing runs by smaller planes. In the largest bombing mission by any nation since World War II, 29 B-52s dropped 585 tons of bombs on the Mụ Giạ Pass through the Annamese Mountain Range, in an attempt to break the supply line that was nicknamed the "Ho Chi Minh trail". Although the objective was to create landslides that would close off the pass completely, a reconnaissance mission the next day found that the Viet Cong guerillas had cleared the area, filled the craters in the road, and were driving their trucks through the pass once more. After a second wave of intensive bombings and an equally intensive clearing of the pass, a CIA appraisal would later note that the "Communists will spare no effort to keep it open".
The trial of Egyptian dissident Sayyid Qutb began in Cairo, after his indictment on charges of conspiring to overthrow the government of President Gamal Abdel Nasser of the United Arab Republic. Qutb and two of his accused co-conspirators would be convicted and hanged on August 29.
U.S. President Johnson told France's President de Gaulle that the United States would not comply with his ultimatum to remove all American troops before April 1, 1967.
The first reported instance of a flag burning in the course of protests against the Vietnam War took place in a theater in New York City, where an antiwar skit entitled LBJ was being performed.
Gemini Agena target vehicle 5005 completed modification and final assembly with the installation of a number of electrical and electronic components for which it had been waiting - including the guidance module, flight control junction box, and flight electronics package. The vehicle was transferred to test complex C-10 at Sunnyvale, California, to begin Vehicle Systems Tests. Preliminary test tasks were completed by April 23, with preliminary inspection on April 26-27.
Gemini Agena target vehicle 5004 began the Combined Interface Test (CIT) at Hangar E, Eastern Test Range, after completing Plan X tests March 24. CIT ended April 22 and engine functional tests of both the primary and secondary propulsion systems followed. Hanger E testing was completed May 1.
NASA Associate Administrator for Manned Space Flight George E. Mueller replied to Robert C. Seamans, Jr.'s, January 6 letter inquiring about several alternate approaches for experiment payload planning for AAP. Mueller compared RCA's suggested approach - broad-purpose laboratories that could be adapted to individual missions by addition of special sensors - to NASA's present method of experiment planning and development; i.e., Principal Investigators who were individually responsible for all aspects of experiment development, including sensors. The present NASA approach, Mueller contended, generated a technical continuity by competent scientists and engineers, thus paying off in "good" science returns from flight missions. He admitted, however, that the Principal Investigators approach demanded the commitment of scientists to their projects over quite lengthy periods of time. The approach therefore tended to limit the number of experiment proposals received (a trend already encountered in the medical and behavioral fields, Mueller noted). In fact, most experiment proposals in these areas came from "inhouse" sources, while only a few were received from the scientific community. Further, the Principal Investigators approach tended toward duplication of inflight operations and equipment. Mueller admitted that the RCA full-laboratory concept had some merit, especially in producing the maximum number of experiments per mission and in fostering early experiment program planning. However, it tended to remove scientists and engineers from the mainstream of experiment development, which could result in loss of continuity over long developmental periods. Mueller put forth a third approach that lay between NASA's present program and the RCA proposal. It was similar to the RCA scheme except that NASA could accept experiments on an individual basis as presently done. The Principal Investigator, while fully responsible for experiment procedure and for data analysis and publication, would also serve as consultant to NASA during development of experiment equipment and crew training. However, the NASA experiment payload integration center would oversee the effort to integrate experiments into the configured inflight laboratory. Mueller observed that NASA was in fact moving toward this middle road in the human spaceflight program. The medical and behavioral experiments were already being planned for configuration into space laboratories, he noted. Nor were the three approaches mutually exclusive. Through "judicious" integration of experiments and mission objectives, Mueller prophesied that NASA could evolve from its current approach to the full-laboratory concept in harmony with the agency's spaceflight capabilities.
Singer Jan Berry of the rock music duo Jan & Dean was seriously injured when he lost control of his Corvette automobile and crashed into a parked truck on Sunset Boulevard in Beverly Hills, California, near (but not at) the slight turn on the Boulevard that was the inspiration for the group's 1963 hit song, "Dead Man's Curve". Berry was in a coma for two months and would undergo years of rehabilitation after awakening.
Died: Sir Waithilingam Duraiswamy, 91, Ceylonese lawyer, politician and speaker of the State Council of Ceylon

April 13, 1966 (Wednesday)

Field Marshal Abdul Salam Arif, the 45-year-old President of Iraq, was killed in a helicopter crash, along with ten of his aides, after the aircraft failed during a sandstorm after their takeoff from Al-Qurnah in southern Iraq, north of the port of Basra. The dead included Interior Minister Abdul Latif Daraji and Minister of Industry Mustafa Abdullah, and the Basra district governor. Prime Minister Abdel Rahman Bazzaz became the Acting President, pending a selection of Marshal Arif's successor.
William Olson, a 24-year-old American Peace Corps volunteer and teacher from Spencer, New York, was eaten by a crocodile while he and five other Corps members were swimming in the Baro River at Gambela, Ethiopia. Olson, whose remains were recovered only after the crocodile was killed and opened up, was the first Corps volunteer to die in Ethiopia, and the first to be killed by an animal.

U.S. President Lyndon Johnson signed the 1966 Uniform Time Act, setting a common date (the last Sunday in April) for all states in the U.S. to set their clocks forward one hour, beginning on April 29, 1967, and to set clocks forward one hour on the last Sunday in October, starting in 1967. At the time, 18 states observed daylight saving time (DST), 14 switched time zones rather than changing their clocks, and the other 18 left the option up to their local governments. Before the Uniform Act was passed, the prescribed days for changing the clocks varied across the nation; in the state of Iowa alone, there were 23 different DST periods.
One day after the Atlanta Braves played their first regular season baseball game since moving from Milwaukee (a 3-2 loss in Atlanta to the New York Mets), Milwaukee County, Wisconsin Circuit Court Judge Elmer W. Roller ordered the team to return to Milwaukee by May 18, unless the National League intended to grant Milwaukee an expansion franchise in 1967. Judge Roller also fined the league, the Braves, and the other nine NL teams $5,000 apiece for violating Wisconsin's antitrust laws. Major League Baseball Commissioner William D. Eckert announced that Judge Roller's decision would be appealed to the Wisconsin Supreme Court. The state Supreme Court would reverse Judge Roller's ruling in August.
The Electrical Interface Integrated Validation and Joint Guidance and Control Test began after Gemini launch vehicle 9 and Gemini spacecraft No. 9 were electrically mated. These activities were completed April 15. The Joint Combined Systems Test was run April 19.
MSC awarded a cost-plus-fixed-fee contract to the Allis-Chalmers Manufacturing Company to develop and test several fuel cell systems for possible use on AAP spacecraft. Allis-Chalmers completed the project at the end of September 1966, but MSC issued a request for proposal for continuing the research effort to adapt the fuel cell to changing AAP requirements.
Died: 
Carlo Carrà, 85, Italian Futurist painter
Georges Duhamel, 81, French novelist
Felix von Luckner, 84, German naval officer known during World War One as "the Sea-Devil" (Der Seeteufel). During the war, he commanded his sea raider SMS Seeadler (literally "Sea Eagle") in the capture of 16 merchant ships, with a minimum loss of enemy lives.

April 14, 1966 (Thursday)
Lieutenant General Nguyen Van Thieu, Head of State and Chairman of the military junta that ruled South Vietnam, signed a decree promising that free national elections for a civilian government would take place by September 15.

Vatican City released the results of its 1966 census and announced that the  nation had a population of 890 people inside its walls, of whom 566 were Vatican citizens. Of those 566 people, 60 were priests, 124 were other members of the clergy, 220 were members of the Swiss Guard, and 162 were civilian employees and their families.
The three convicted assassins of Malcolm X were each sentenced to life in prison, after having been found guilty of murdering the Black Nationalist leader at the Audubon Ballroom in New York City on February 21, 1965. "Norman 3X" Butler (later Muhammad Abdul Aziz), "Thomas 15X" Johnson (later Khalil Islam) and Thomas Hagan (aka Talmadge Hayer), all members of the Black Muslim's Nation of Islam movement, had been found guilty on March 11. Johnson had been the first to fire, cutting down Malcolm X with two blasts from a shotgun, and Hagan and Butler then completed the execution with their pistols. Butler and Johnson would be paroled in 1985 and 1987, respectively, while Hagan would be released from prison after 44 years in 2010.
The Combined Systems Acceptance Test (CSAT) of Gemini launch vehicle (GLV) 10 was conducted at Martin-Baltimore. The CSAT was followed by a performance data review, completed April 19. The vehicle acceptance team convened April 26 and accepted GLV-10 on April 29. The vehicle was deerected May 2-4 and formally accepted by the U.S. Air Force May 18. Stage I was flown to Cape Kennedy the same day, with stage II following May 20. Both stages were transferred to Hangar L where they were purged and pressurized with dry nitrogen and placed in controlled access storage.
At a news conference in Colorado, NASA Administrator James E. Webb stated that the AAP would be hampered by a lack of payloads unless Congress granted additional funds in the Fiscal Year 1968 budget. Efforts to obtain appropriations for post-Apollo projects were hindered by rising costs of the Vietnamese conflict and congressional discontent with NASA's increasing administrative costs. Asked about the House Government Operations Committee's suggestion that NASA abandon AAP and participate in the Air Force's Manned Orbiting Laboratory program, Webb denied that "complete common use" of facilities was possible. He noted that many countries in which the United States had tracking facilities would not cooperate if those installations were used for military projects.
Born: Greg Maddux, American Baseball Hall of Fame pitcher; in San Angelo, Texas

April 15, 1966 (Friday)
A mob of 2,000 Indonesian Chinese protesters attacked the Embassy of the People's Republic of China in Jakarta, smashing windows and doors, throwing documents into bonfires, and tearing down the PRC flag. The protesters, Indonesian citizens with Chinese ancestry, made the attack after a two-hour rally in which they pledged their loyalty to Indonesia.
An American military spokesman reported that there had been 1,361 U.S. servicemen killed in the Vietnam War in 1966 as of April 9, already more than the 1,342 that had died during the entire year of 1965. By April, according to the press release, the combat death rate for U.S. Army, Marine, Navy and Air Force personnel had was now averaging 100 people per week.
Uganda's Prime Minister Milton Obote declared himself to be the President of Uganda under the newly approved constitution of that African nation. The office had been vacant since March 2, when Dr. Obote sent the ceremonial President, Sir Edward Mutesa, into exile.
MSC Director Robert R. Gilruth summarized Houston's position expressed during discussions with NASA Associate Administrator for Manned Space Flight George E. Mueller two days earlier. Gilruth cited NASA's need for a human spaceflight goal other than "using Apollo hardware" (and suggested a Mars flyby or landing mission as an in-house focus for planning). Also, he repeated his concern over the imbalance between AAP goals and resources, as well as the extent of engineering redesign and hardware modification that had been forced upon the project. Though expressing his and MSC's desire to contribute to and be a part of AAP, Gilruth voiced concern that "the future of manned space flight . . . is in jeopardy because we do not have firm goals, and because the present approach appears to us to be technically unsound."
NASA Associate Administrator for Manned Space Fight George E. Mueller informed Deputy Administrator Robert C. Seamans, Jr., of the Saturn/Apollo Applications Program Office's evaluation of a Lockheed proposal to launch space probes from orbit using Agena rockets launched from AAP stations in space. The proposal was feasible, Mueller advised, but did not seem a desirable mission for inclusion in the AAP. Lockheed's proposal estimated a  payload to Mars, a performance capability not sufficient to justify the proposal solely on a mission basis. (In contrast, the Saturn IB Centaur offered a  capability.) The other aspect of Lockheed's proposal concerned the development of techniques for launching vehicles from orbit. In this area, the chief contributions anticipated from AAP were assembly of large vehicles in orbit, fuel transfer, and preparation for orbital launch. Final checkout, which Lockheed proposed should be done by the astronauts, Mueller said could be accomplished more effectively by ground engineering groups through telemetry displays. Therefore, he recommended to Seamans that the proposal not be considered for inclusion in Saturn/AAP.
Born: Chai Ling, Chinese women's rights activist who guided the Tiananmen Square protests of 1989 while she was a student at Beijing University; in Rizhao, Shandong province

April 16, 1966 (Saturday)

 The millennium of the founding of the nation of Poland, and the 1,000th anniversary of the date that its rulers first endorsed the Christian faither, was celebrated by both church and state in separate ceremonies at the city of Gniezno. Poland's first ruler, Mieszko the First, had received Christian baptism on Easter Sunday, April 15, 966, at the age of 26. Church ceremonies at St. Adalbert's Cathedral ended in time for Communist Party leaders to assemble at the town square for public addresses.
 After 83 years at West 39th Street and Broadway, New York City's original Metropolitan Opera House conducted its final performance before closing its doors. A standing-room-only crowd watched a five-hour performance of operatic arias by 60 different singers at "The Met". To introduce the program, the Met's general manager, Sir Rudolf Bing, summed up the move to the new location at the Lincoln Center on West 63rd Street, saying "The company goes on and will do all we can to deserve your continued support.  The queen is dead.  Long live the queen!"  
 Italian poet Dante Alighieri was cleared of charges of conspiracy against the city of Florence, and of corruption in public office, following an eight-hour hearing convened in Arezzo by a court headed by former Court of Cassations  President Ernesto Eula, and that included former Prime Minister Giovanni Leone.  Dante had been sentenced to death in both 1303 and 1315 after trials in Florence, but was subsequently exiled and had passed away on September 13, 1321.  The hearing was the last event in a series of celebrations of the 700th anniversary of Dante's birth.
 Chinese intellectual, poet and journalist Deng Tuo was publicly chastised by the government newspaper Beijing Daily, which revealed that he had written literary and political works that were now judged as counterrevolutionary, and listed the various pen names that he had used. More denunciations followed and on May 17, he committed suicide.
 Died: Nandalal Bose, 83, Indian painter

April 17, 1966 (Sunday)
Major General Abdul Rahman Arif was sworn in as the new President of Iraq, three days after the death of his younger brother and predecessor in office, Abdul Salam Arif. He would remain in office for two years, before being overthrown by Ahmed Hassan al-Bakr on July 17, 1968.
Ian Smith, the Prime Minister of Rhodesia, announced that his nation was severing the last of its ties to the United Kingdom, closing the British mission in the capital at Salisbury, Rhodesia (now Harare, Zimbabwe) and removing the last of its staffers at the former High Commissioner's office at the Rhodesia House.
Wrotham transmitting station in Kent, England, became the first BBC transmitter to broadcast in stereo.
In one of the better known unidentified flying object (UFO) cases of the decade, two deputies with the Sheriff's office of Portage County, Ohio, Dale Spaur and W.L. Neff, were investigating a traffic accident at 5:00 a.m., when they were alerted by the dispatcher that there was an unknown object heading toward their vicinity. On the same morning, police in Benton Harbor, Michigan, received reports about UFO sightings as well. Sadly, Spaur would lose his job and his marriage, and he and the others involved in the chase would be ridiculed by the public.

April 18, 1966 (Monday)
The Cultural Revolution was officially proclaimed in the People's Republic of China, with the publication of the government announcement that gave the name that would define the era of upheaval. The official People's Liberation Army daily newspaper, Jiefangjun Bao, published a front-page editorial with the title "Hold High the Great Red Banner of Mao Tse-tung's Thought, and Actively Participate in the Great Socialist Cultural Revolution".
The government of India declared the new Paradip Port to be the nation's eighth major port. Located in the state of Odisha, Paradip was also the first major port on India's east coast.
As a counter to France's announcement that it would withdraw from NATO on July 1, West Germany's Foreign Minister Gerhard Schroeder informed his French counterpart, Maurice Couve de Murville, that the 75,000 French troops in West Germany would either have to be placed under German authority or withdrawn.
Bill Russell became the first African-American head coach in the National Basketball Association (NBA), when the Boston Celtics named him to the helm at the end of the regular season. Russell, who would continue to play for the Celtics even while coaching them, was named after Red Auerbach decided to retire from coaching in order to spend full-time as the Celtics' general manager.
The first official sporting event ever played on AstroTurf, the original artificial turf made to resemble grass, took place at the Houston Astrodome in Texas. Originally, the turf was installed only in the infield. Astros outfielder Jimmy Wynn would later comment, "You could already feel the difference in how quickly the ball moved when it took its first good roll or hard bounce off that surface. It occurred to me that big changes were coming." The visiting Los Angeles Dodgers defeated the Houston Astros in that game, 6-3. The Dodgers and the Astros had previously been the first to test the turf in a preseason exhibition game on March 19.
Stage I of Gemini launch vehicle 11 was erected in the west cell of the vertical test facility at Martin-Baltimore. After completing horizontal tests April 25, stage II was erected April 29. Power was applied to the vehicle for the first time on May 9, and Subsystems Functional Verification Tests were completed June 8.

The extravehicular life support system (ELSS) for Gemini spacecraft No. 9 was returned to Cape Kennedy and underwent an electrical compatibility test with the astronaut maneuvering unit (AMU). An ELSS/AMU Joint Combined System Test was run the following day and rerun April 21. The ELSS was then delivered to Manned Spacecraft Center for tests (April 22) while the AMU was prepared for installation in the adapter. The ELSS was returned to the Cape April 26. AMU Final Systems Test and installation for flight were accomplished May 7. The ELSS was serviced and installed for flight May 16.
The Sound of Music, which had already broken the record for highest grossing motion picture, earned five Oscars out of ten nominations, including the award for Best Picture, at the 38th Academy Awards.

April 19, 1966 (Tuesday)
Roberta Gibb of San Diego became the first woman to run in the Boston Marathon, though unofficially, because the foot race was officially limited to men at the time.  Gibb had applied to the Boston Athletic Association in 1965 to run for that year's Marathon, and was rejected with a letter explaining that it was "not physiologically possible for a woman" to run the distance of more than 26 miles. On the day of the 1966 race, Gibb dressed in a hooded sweatshirt and sweatpants, hid near the starting line, then jumped in with the other runners as the race began in Hopkinton.  Unofficially, Gibb (whose married name was Mrs. Roberta Bingay) finished in 124th place in the field of more than 500 contestants, completing the course in 3 hours, 21 minutes and 25 seconds.  Winning the laurels in first place was Kenji Kimihara, who, as with the finishers in second (Seiichiro Sasaki), third (Toru Terasawa) and fourth place (Hikokoaru Okabe) was from Japan.
Ian Brady and Myra Hindley went on trial at Chester Crown Court, before Mr Justice Fenton Atkinson, for the murders of three children who had vanished between November 1963 and October 1965.  They would be convicted two weeks later. 
Died: 
Javier Solís, 34, Mexican singer of ranchera & bolero music, from complications following routine gallbladder surgery
Väinö Tanner, 85, Prime Minister of Finland, 1926-1927

April 20, 1966 (Wednesday)
President Liu Shaoqi of China first came under criticism from the Red Guards, the group of students who carried out the call from Chairman Mao Zedong to identify national enemies as part of the Cultural Revolution. President Liu was accused of being a capitalist and a member of the "bourgeois and feudal remnants" of pre-revolutionary China. As a scapegoat for China's problems, Liu would be fired, arrested and tortured before his death in 1969.
Sixty people were killed and 122 injured when a terrorist bomb exploded on a passenger train at a railroad station in Lumding, in the Assam State in northeastern India. The Indian government attributed the blast to Naga separatists. Only three days later, another bomb attack, this time in the Assamese town of Diphu, would kill 29 people.
The tanking test of Gemini launch vehicle (GLV) 9 was conducted. While the GLV was undergoing post-tanking cleanup, the spacecraft computer and extravehicular systems were retested (April 21-22), pyrotechnics were installed in the spacecraft (April 25), spacecraft final systems tests were run (April 27-28), spacecraft crew stowage was reviewed (April 29), and the astronaut maneuvering unit was reverified (April 30-May 2). On May 3 the spacecraft and launch vehicle were temporarily mated for an erector-cycling test. GLV systems were then revalidated in preparation for Simultaneous Launch Demonstration (SLD), while spacecraft extravehicular equipment was reworked and revalidated. Spacecraft and GLV were mated for flight May 8. The SLD was conducted May 10, the Final Simulated Flight Test on May 11.
Born: 
David Filo, American billionaire, computer entrepreneur and co-founder (with Jerry Yang) of Yahoo!; in Madison, Wisconsin
Vincent Riendeau, Canadian ice hockey player, in Saint-Hyacinthe, Quebec

April 21, 1966 (Thursday)
The opening of the Parliament of the United Kingdom was televised for the first time.

Ethiopia's Emperor Haile Selassie, known before his ascent to the throne as Ras Tafari Makonnen, a Ras among the Ethiopian nobility, was and remains a Messianic figure among thousands of adherents to the Rastafarian religion, primarily in Jamaica. When he arrived in Jamaica, thirty years after Rastafarianism took root, he was greeted at the Palisadoes Airport in Kingston by more than 100,000 people. The anniversary of his visit is still celebrated as "Grounation Day", a holy day in the Rastafarian religion.

For the first time, an artificial heart was installed in a human being, as Dr. Michael DeBakey and a team of surgeons from Baylor University implanted the device into coal miner Marcel DeRudder in order to keep him alive. The six-hour surgery took place at the Methodist Hospital in Houston. Five days later, DeRudder, a resident of Westville, Illinois, would die from a ruptured lung.
MSC Director Robert R. Gilruth designated Deputy Director George M. Low as the principal focus and point of contact for all matters pertaining to AAP. This action, Gilruth told George E. Mueller, NASA HQ, was only a short-range measure. He stated that he planned to create an AAP office as soon as practical, but that such action would take a number of weeks because it would involve a number of people throughout the Houston organization.
Died: Sepp Dietrich, 73, convicted Nazi German war criminal and general who commanded various armored divisions during World War II.

April 22, 1966 (Friday)

Gurkha Lance-Corporal Rambahadur Limbu, a native of Nepal serving with the 10th Gurkha Rifles of the British Army, was awarded the Victoria Cross for his heroism at Sarawak on November 21, 1965. It was the first time in more than 12 years that the Victoria Cross, emblematic of outstanding bravery and selfless conduct, had been awarded.
American Flyers Flight 280, a Lockheed Electra turboprop airplane carrying 92 U.S. Army soldiers and a crew of six on the way back from training camp, crashed while trying to land at Ardmore, Oklahoma for refueling. The airplane had been en route from Fort Ord, California to Fort Benning, Georgia, and crashed into the foothills of the Arbuckle Mountains,  from the airport, killing 81 of the people on board.
Gemini Program Manager Charles W. Mathews reported the launch dates tentatively scheduled for Gemini X as July 18, for Gemini XI as September 7, and for Gemini XII as October 31, 1966.
NASA Deputy Director Robert C. Seamans, Jr., told Associate Administrator for Space Science and Applications Homer E. Newell that he had no choice but to delay initiation of development competition on the Apollo Telescope Mount (ATM) until the AAP funding picture for the next two fiscal years became clearer. Because he had been unable to identify any source for the funds that would be required for the project during Fiscal Year 1967, Seamans said, "I am extremely reluctant to start a competition in industry at a time when we cannot see our way clear to proceeding in a timely fashion." On the other hand, he said he recognized Newell's deep interest in the ATM project and its scientific value and he was ready to proceed with advanced study work. Accordingly, he said he had signed the sole source award to Ball Brothers Research Corporation to study adapting the ATM for automatic observations in orbit beyond the basic 14-day crewed mission and to study adapting the ATM to the Apollo lunar module (LM) for extended crewed operations. Seamans expressed his own conviction that, to meet the objectives of the AAP mission at the earliest possible time, it would be best to mount the ATM directly on the Apollo command and service modules. If the present fiscal problem precluded such an arrangement, he told Newell, the agency would then be in a better position at a later date to decide whether the ATM should be included as part of the LM or whether some alternate approach should be used.
MSC Deputy Director George M. Low proposed that Gemini Program Deputy Manager Kenneth S. Kleinknecht head the Source Evaluation Board, comprising members from NASA Headquarters, MSFC, and MSC, for the Saturn S-IVB spent-stage experiment support module. Pending formal approval, Low said, MSC planned to go ahead with sundry preevaluation activities so as not to impede formal contractual efforts.

April 23, 1966 (Saturday)
The New York Herald Tribune and a more recent product of merger, the New York World-Telegram and Sun both published their final issues.  That evening, negotiations between the Newspaper Guild of New York and the Publishers Association of New York City failed and the newspaper employees walked out on strike, postponing plans for their merged company, World Journal Tribune, Inc., to publish. 
Aerial combat in the Vietnam War entered a new phase as the North Vietnamese Air Force sent its first MiG-21 to fight against U.S. Air Force bombers.  Two B-66 Destroyers were being escorted to their mission by a flight of F-4 Phantoms when the MiG-21, faster and better armed than previous North Vietnamese jets, came in behind them.  Despite attempts by one of the F-4s to shoot down the MiG-21, neither side struck the other during the first mission.

The cassock, a long black, multi-buttoned garment that had served as the standard uniform for Roman Catholic clergy in Italy, Spain and Poland for centuries, was no longer required to be worn at all times, as the dress code was eased by the church.  Under new rules, priests were allowed to wear "modern" suits (jacket and pants) with the clerical collar, though not while in Rome, or when performing religious duties or teaching religion in schools.
Died: George Ohsawa (born Nyoichi Sakurazawa), 72, Japanese founder of the philosophy of the macrobiotic diet

April 24, 1966 (Sunday)
Pascal Lissouba resigned as Prime Minister of Congo (Brazzaville) and was replaced by Ambroise Noumazalaye.
The 1966 United States Road Racing Championship season began, with the Stardust Grand Prix at Las Vegas, Nevada.  The opening race was won by Canada's John Cannon.
A "mini-census" was conducted across the United Kingdom in Great Britain and Northern Ireland, using a ten percent sample.  The detailed results, however, were ordered sealed for a century and are not scheduled to be released until January 1, 2067.
Born: David Justice, American major league baseball player, in Cincinnati.
Died: 
Vyacheslav Oltarzhevsky, 86, Soviet skyscraper architect
George Humphrey, 76, English psychologist who, in 1923, published one of the first popular books about experimental psychology, The Story of Man's Mind
Louis A. Johnson, 75, U.S. Secretary of Defense who was fired by President Harry Truman after the Korean War began

April 25, 1966 (Monday)
The Kelud volcano in Indonesia, in East Java, erupted, sending lava and hot ash over into the surrounding area.  According to the Indonesian news agency Antara, the village of Bambunan was destroyed  along with much of another nearby hamlet, Margomuijo. The final death toll for three days of eruptions, including a larger blast on April 27, was 175 people, with another 60 missing.  The final toll, after the cessation of the eruption on May 7, would be 215.
Eleven schoolchildren, mostly 7 and 8 years old, were killed by a drunken driver in Belgium in the town of Waregem-Asse while their teacher was giving them a lesson on how to safely cross the street. The children had been standing on a sidewalk when a bakery truck skidded on to the curb after coming around a curve.  The driver, 43 year old Emile Tibeout, was later charged with manslaughter.
The first edition of the British newspaper Morning Star (formerly the Daily Worker) was issued.
TASS, the official Soviet news agency, reported that Asmar Salakhova of the Armenian SSR was the oldest woman in the world at the supposed age of 153 years old.  Mrs. Salkhova claimed that she had been born in 1812, that she had been forced to go into exile at the age of 65 after an invasion in 1877, and that after 62 years away, when she was 137, "her dream came true" of returning home in 1949.
Died: Maria Nikolaevna Kuznetsova, 85, Russian/Soviet opera singer and dancer

April 26, 1966 (Tuesday)
At their meeting in Rome, the International Olympic Committee voted for the site of 1972's Summer and Winter Olympic games.  There were four candidates for the 1972 Summer Olympics, from West Germany (Munich), Spain (Madrid), Canada (Montreal) and the United States (Detroit), with none getting a majority of the 61 votes on the first ballot.  On the second vote, Munich got 31, Madrid 15, Montreal 14 and Detroit (which had 6 votes the first time) zero.  Sapporo, Japan was awarded the 1972 Winter Olympics on the first ballot, receiving 32 votes, with the entry from Canada (Banff, Alberta) getting 16, and Lahti (Finland) and the American candidate (Salt Lake City, Utah) receiving seven apiece. 
An attempt to assassinate the Sultan of Oman, Said bin Taimur, failed while the monarch was inspecting troops at the 'Ain Razat Army Camp near Salalah.  The commander of a nine-man ceremonial guard, Staff Sergeant Sa'id Suhayl Qatn, and another guard, two other guards, raised their rifles during a salute, and then took aim at the Sultan himself, but "missed him by a considerable distance". Both mutineers had secretly been working with the Dhofar Liberation Front.  The Sultan would order a blockade of Dhofar mountains, and the erection of a fence around the city of Salalah, effectively imprisoning the people there by barring entry or exit from the town. Becoming increasingly paranoid, he would withdraw from all further public appearances, and would eventually be deposed in 1970 by his son, Qaboos bin Said al Said.
In Amravati, India, 32 employees of a cottonseed oil mill were killed and 26 others seriously injured in an explosion.
Born: Natasha Trethewey, American poet, in Gulfport, Mississippi

April 27, 1966 (Wednesday)
In the first meeting between the leader of the Roman Catholic Church and a governmental minister from any Communist nation, Pope Paul VI received Soviet Foreign Minister Andrei Gromyko in a private audience at the Vatican.
LANSA Flight 501 crashed into the side of Mount Talaula in Peru while on a flight from Lima to Cuzco, killing all 43 passengers and six crew.  Subsequent investigation concluded that the pilot of the Lockheed Constellation airplane, operated by Líneas Aéreas Nacionales S. A. (LANSA), misjudged the height of the mountains, resulting in an impact while at an altitude of 12,600 feet.
A 17-year old American girl sneaked aboard the British submarine HMS Walrus while it was docked at Baltimore.  A runaway, she was discovered after the sub was four hours out to sea, saying that she had wanted to go to England, and the Walrus returned to the United States.  The Royal Navy attaché to the U.S., Captain Douglas Scobe, told reporters later, "Taking one of their citizens is rather overextending our appreciation of their hospitality in Baltimore."

April 28, 1966 (Thursday)
In the Battle of Sinoia in Rhodesia (now Zimbabwe), the British South Africa Police killed seven ZANLA men in combat, escalating the second Chimurenga or Rhodesian Bush War The force of 21 men, armed with AK-47 machine guns and grenades and calling itself "The Armageddon Group", had entered Rhodesia from Zambia, then split into three groups; another group of seven reached a white-owned farm and murdered a husband and wife, marking the first of the "white farm murders" in Rhodesia. The anniversary of the confrontation at Sinoia (now called Chinhoyi) is now celebrated as Chimurenga Day, marking the beginning of black liberation from the white minority government. 
A high tension wire electrocuted 19 sugar cane workers near the city of São Simão in Brazil, and injured 25 others, when the truck they were riding in made contact with the fallen line.
American composer Douglas Moore's stage opera Carry Nation, about the temperance crusader Carrie Nation, was performed for the first time in Lawrence, Kansas as part of the centennial celebration of the founding of the University of Kansas.  It would be presented by the New York City Opera on March 28, 1968. 
Born:: 
John Daly, American professional golfer and 1991 PGA champion, in Carmichael, California
Too $hort (stage name for Todd Anthony Shaw), American hip-hop artist, in Los Angeles
Ali-Reza Pahlavi, titular prince of Iran and second in line for the abolished Pahlavi family monarchy at the time of his death; in Tehran (committed suicide 2011)

April 29, 1966 (Friday)
The total number of U.S. troops in South Vietnam reached 250,000 with one-quarter of a million Americans committed to the war there, as 4,000 members of the 25th U.S. Infantry Division came ashore at Vũng Tàu.

The Boston Celtics won the championship of the National Basketball Association in Game 7 of the best-of-7 NBA Finals, defeating the Los Angeles Lakers, 95-93, holding off the Lakers' bid to overcome a 95-85 deficit in the last 90 seconds.  The victory marked Boston's eighth consecutive NBA Championship, and the farewell game for coach Red Auerbach.

April 30, 1966 (Saturday)

Regular hovercraft service began over the English Channel, between Ramsgate and Calais, with an SR.N6 transporting 36 passengers.  It would be discontinued in 2000.  The customers paid two pounds, two shillings (equivalent to $6.30) apiece for the journey.
Anton LaVey of San Francisco founded the Church of Satan, declaring April 30 (the pagan holiday Walpurgisnacht) as the beginning of the first day of the first "Anno Satanas".
The body of Prince Frederick of Prussia, 54, fourth son of Crown Prince Wilhelm of Germany and grandson of Kaiser Wilhelm II, was found in the Rhine river near the town of Bingen am Rhein, two weeks after he went missing from his home in the West German village of Erbach.
Died: 
Richard Fariña, 29, American folk singer and novelist, killed in a motorcycle accident in Carmel Valley Village, California, after a book-signing party for his first novel  
Everett Case, 65, North Carolina State University basketball coach who would later be inducted into the Basketball Hall of Fame.  In his will, Case bequeathed three-quarters of his estate to be divided among the 57 players whom he had coached over the years.

References

1966
1966-04
1966-04